Xylophanes letiranti is a moth of the  family Sphingidae which can be found in Panama and Costa Rica.

Description 
It is similar to Xylophanes crotonis but larger and darker and the antennae are more robust. The forewing upperside is very dark green, emerald green or brownish with touches of green. There is a diffuse black patch present distal to the discal spot, between the costa and the first postmedian line, contrasting with the ground colour. All oblique lines heavier than corresponding lines in Xylophanes crotonis. The fourth postmedian line is enlarged into a dark, diffuse, triangular patch on the inner margin. The oblique black lines on the forewing underside are straighter and more diffuse than in Xylophanes crotonis and the pale yellow spots forming the median band on the hindwing upperside are smaller and speckled with black scales, giving them a more blurred and sombre aspect.

References

letiranti
Moths described in 2003